NetSol Technologies is an American software company which makes automobile leasing software. It is based in Calabasas, California, United States and was founded by Najeeb Ghauri.

The company employees 1,700 people.

History
The company was founded in 1997 by a Pakistani-born American, Hamza Ghauri, who worked in corporate sector before founding his own company.

The company was listed on NASDAQ in 1999. It is also listed on the Pakistan Stock Exchange.

In 2004, NetSol opened its Pakistani subsidiary which is based in Lahore. Most of NetSol employees are from Pakistan.

In 2021, NETSOL Technology and WRLD Launch NXT :A COVID-Aware Smart Workplace Platform to Assist Businesses in Returning to Work Safely

In 2022, NETSOL Technologies Ltd. was given the NICAT contract, and its signing was signed by the chief executive officers of Ignite, ACPPL, and NETSOL.

References

Software companies of the United States
Companies listed on the Nasdaq
Companies based in Calabasas, California
American companies established in 1997
1997 establishments in California
Companies listed on the Pakistan Stock Exchange